Samuel Sydney Doumany  (born 2 September 1937) is an Australian retired politician. He was a Member of the Queensland Legislative Assembly and Attorney-General and Minister for Justice in Queensland.

Political career
Doumany was elected to the Queensland Legislative Assembly as the Liberal candidate for Kurilpa at the 1974 election.

He was Minister for Welfare from 10 October 1978 to 23 December 1980. He was Minister for Justice and Attorney-General from 23 December 1980 to 18 August 1983.

He held Kurilpa until the 1983 election when he was defeated by Labor candidate Anne Warner.

Honours
In 2022, Doumany was appointed as a Member of the Order of Australia (AM) in the 2022 Australia Day Honours for "significant service to parliament and politics in Queensland, and to the community".

See also
 Members of the Queensland Legislative Assembly, 1974–1977; 1977-1980; 1980-1983

References

1937 births
Australian people of Lebanese descent
University of Sydney alumni
Liberal Party of Australia members of the Parliament of Queensland
Politicians from Sydney
Living people
Members of the Queensland Legislative Assembly
Attorneys-General of Queensland
Members of the Order of Australia